The Evening Standard London Five-a-Sides was an annual indoor football tournament organized by the Sports Council (now Sport England). As the competition name suggests it featured Football League clubs from the capital city. The latter years of the event was open to Football League clubs outside London.

History 

The competition usually took place towards end of the domestic football season in April or May. The competition was on six-year hiatus from 1961 to 1966 and then a seven=year break between 1986 and 1992.

The first venue of choice was the Empress Hall, Earls Court. The second edition was transferred to the Harringay Arena. The event moved to Empire Pool Wembley in 1959. It shared a home with the National Five-a Side tournament that ran from 1968 to 1986.

ITV (Thames Television) covered the best of the action on its late evening show Midweek Sports Special for London and surrounding areas only. The final three editions in the 1990s were shown by Sky TV to a wider audience.

Winners

Titles by Club

References

External links 
Midweek Football Coverage 1968/69 - 1982/83 Midweek Football on TV.
Evening Standard London 5-a-Sides, 1983 The Football Attic.

Indoor soccer competitions
Recurring sporting events established in 1954
1954 establishments in England
1995 disestablishments in England
Defunct football cup competitions in England
Recurring sporting events disestablished in 1995
London Evening Standard